The 1932 Great Britain Lions tour was a tour by the Great Britain national rugby league team) of Australia and New Zealand which took place between May and August 1932. The tour involved a schedule of 26 games, 18 in Australia including a three-test series against Australia for the Ashes and a further eight in New Zealand including a three-test series against New Zealand.

Captained by Welshman Jim Sullivan, the Lions returned home having won 23, lost two and drawn one of their games. They won the Ashes against Australia by two tests to one and made a clean sweep against New Zealand winning all three test matches.

Despite being a British team - six of the squad were Welsh - the team were universally referred to by both the press at home and away, as England.

Squad
A 26-man squad was selected for the tour with the names announced in March 1932.

The two team managers were G.F. Hutchins of Oldham and R.F. Anderton of Warrington.

Schedule and results
The team sailed from Southampton on 14 April 1932 on-board the SS Jervis Bay arriving in Melbourne on 19 May and travelling to Sydney by train on 20 May. 

Following the end of the third test against New Zealand, the team sailed for home the same day on-board the SS Tamaroa, having readied for the last test on the ship, arriving back in Southampton on 23 September 1932.

During the Australian leg of the tour the team scored 105 tries and 84 goals (483 points) while conceding 32 tries and 38 goals (172 points), total attendances approaching 320,000 generated gate receipts of A£27,885. In the games in New Zealand the team scored 65 tries and 52 goals (299 points) conceding 17 tries and 18 goals (87 points).

Ashes series

First test

The first test was played at Sydney Cricket Ground on Monday 6 June 1932.  The interest in the game was so large that the ground was full an hour before the kick-off and the police ordered the gates to be closed.  Several thousand people watched from the stands in the adjacent agricultural ground and many more watched from any vantage point they could find.

The referee was former Australian player turned match official William Neill.  A ceremonial kick-off was made by retired player Dally Messenger.  England scored first as Alf Ellaby ran a try in from the English 25-yard (20-metre) line, Jim Sullivan missed the conversion.  Australia took the lead through two penalties both taken by Eric Weissel before England scored another try, this time scored by Arthur Atkinson.  Sullivan was successful with the conversion giving England an 8–4 lead.  Weissel scored another penalty before half time to make the score 8–6 in England's favour. The second half was scoreless although both sides had chances which weren't taken.

The final attendance figure was announced as 70,204 a new record for any rugby league game until then. 
It would remain the international attendance record for another 60 years.

Second test

The second test was played in Brisbane on 18 June 1932, two weeks after the first test. 26,000 packed into the Brisbane Cricket Ground to witness what many consider to be one of the most violent games of rugby league ever played.  Many subsequent writers have named the game the Battle of Brisbane

Before the game started the Australian manager, Harry Sunderland, went into the English dressing room with the referee to lecture the English team on how the play-the-ball was to be interpreted during the game, an act which bewildered the English players. As the game kicked off, Australia made an excellent start when Hector Gee scored a try in the first minute which Weissel converted to give Australia a 5–0 lead.  At the first scrum the English prop, Joe Thompson, was knocked out and had to be carried from the pitch; as substitutions were not allowed at this date, teams had to play short until the injured players were fit to return.  Within the first 10 minutes, Australia scored another try as Joe Wilson went over after a scrum near the English goal line. The conversion was missed so the score remained 8–0.  England had a try disallowed and shortly before half-time Australia increased their lead to 10–0 with another Weissel penalty.  During the half Thompson had returned to the pitch and the Australian centre Ernie Norman had left the pitch having been "sandwiched" by two of the English backs. The Australian winger, Cliff Pearce was knocked unconscious by the English centre, Arthur Atkinson but without any action being taken by the referee.

The second half carried on in the same vein, England scored two tries through Stanley Smith and Ernest Pollard to bring the score to 10–6 but the injury list got longer. Gee sustained a severe cut to his upper lip which required stitches, Australian lock forward Frank O'Connor and English forwards, Bill Horton and Leslie White all suffered head injuries which required stitching.  With 15 minutes left Australia were reduced to only 10 men on the pitch, Gee has been stretchered off with concussion, Norman was receiving treatment for another injury and Dan Dempsey had his arm broken.  Worse was to come as Weissel broke his ankle, but refused to leave the pitch.  Manager, Harry Sunderland pushed both Norman and Gee back onto the field even though there weren't fit enough to rejoin.  England were applying pressure with the ball but somehow a loose ball was passed to Weissel who, even with a broken ankle, managed to run  before Sullivan tackled him just three yards from the goal line.  From the play-the-ball Gee took the ball and scored a try which Pearce converted to give Australia a 15–6 lead which was how the game ended.

Even though the Australian win levelled the series at one-all, some Australian writers were highly critical of the way the game had been played by both sides. Harry Sunderland wrote in the Brisbane Courier "I have had the pleasure of seeing 21 of those tests, and I regret to have to admit that if we have got to study the tactics to beat England in the kind of football indulged in on Saturday, I would sooner readjust my views about possessing an enthusiasm for sport of its type.  In four weeks we will have the deciding game for the "Ashes" and I must candidly admit that I would rather have Australia fail to win the coveted cup than have a repetition of some of the things I saw with the naked eye on Saturday" although Sunderland did admit that the animosity shown during the match did not endure as he met many of the players from both teams drinking together in a nightclub that evening.  "The Cynic" writing in the Referee said "It became the most desperate and rugged game imaginable. Player were left strewn like dead men on the field, or were carted off to the touch-lines to recover." M. Erskine Wyse in the Telegraph said "A few Mill's bombs and trench mortars were all that were needed in the closing stages to complete the impression of a battlefield." Most were of the opinion that the referee was not up to the standard required to officiate at a match at this level.

The English press while admitting it had been a hard game were far less critical of the way the game had been played and placed much more of the blame on the match officials. English prop Joe Thompson writing for the Yorkshire Evening Post said "There is no doubt that the second test of the 1932 tour will go down as the roughest and toughest match in the history of the game - a game full of incidents that are best forgotten.

Rugby League football in Australia is at a very low ebb at present, and if there is anything going to kill our game, it is a match of this description, where the game is forgotten, where referee and linesmen have no control over the game, with the players breaking the rules, and doing things which in England would mean their instant dismissal, but here not even a caution.

We have our troubles in England with the referee question, but I should like to say that the weakest of our referees at home is a Mussolini compared with the officials here. I have never seen such a lot of weak-kneed officials in all my career."

Third test

By contrast to the second test, the third was described as "a classic" and "one of the greatest and most exciting in these international contests".

Having won the toss and choosing to kick off Australia raced to a 9–0 lead through two penalties taken by Weissel and a try by Frank O'Connor which Weissel converted.  It wasn't until late in the first half that England scored when Stanley Smith touched down for a try.  At half-time the score was 9–3.  For the second half England moved Gus Risman from stand off where on his debut he had not had a good first half and played Stan Brogden at stand off instead. This change unsettled the Australians who in attempting to cover Brogden often left Evans, the scum half, free to play the ball to the three-quarter line.  While Australia scored first in the half, another Weissel penalty, the greater speed of the English three-quarters eventually came to the fore.  Brogden was the first to score a try to make the score 11–6 to Australia.  Shortly afterwards Smith raced over and with Sullivan converting the try made the score 11–11.  England then took the lead 13–11 as Sullivan kicked a drop goal; Weissel then re-levelled the scores with another penalty.  With under 10 minutes left to play Smith completed his hat trick with a try in the corner, with Sullivan converting the try this made the score 18–13 to England and with no further scoring England took the series 2–1 as the game ended.

New Zealand test series

First test

The opening test of the three-match series was played at Carlaw Park, Auckland on 30 July 1932, three days after England's only warm-up match. The first half saw the lead change hands on five occasions.  New Zealand took a 2–0 lead through an Albert Laing penalty, England's Alf Ellaby then scored an uncoverted try for England to lead 3–2.  Another Laing penalty edged Zealand in front 4–3 before Arthur Atkinson raced past three defenders to put England back in front 6–4. Bert Cooke then dummied his way through to score a try which Laing converted to make the half-time score 9–6 to New Zealand.

The second half was a different story as England scored 18 unanswered points.  Almost immediately from the kick-off, Risman intercepted a pass by Hutt and the move ended with Atkinson scoring his second try. Sullivan kicked the conversion to give England the lead 11–9.  Two more tries by Jack Feetham and a second for Ellaby along with two goals from Sullivan made it 21–9 to England before Smith rounded the game off with a try to make the final score 24–9.

Second test

The second test was played in Christchurch on 13 August 1932 and was reported in the press as disappointing "the game did not reach the high standard of skill expected from the teams" was the opinion of one English reporter and "At no stage was the game very exciting" was the summary of the New Zealand Press Association reporter.

As in the first test, New Zealand took the lead.  The first try was scored by Claude List but England equalised with a try by Brogden and with Sullivan's successful conversion took a 5–3 lead.  The scores were levelled with a Puti Watene penalty but a converted try by Atkinson gave England a lead to 10–5 before a second List try and two goals by Watene gave New Zealand a half-time lead 12–10.

In the second half, Watene kicked another penalty but that was New Zealand's last score as tries by Smith, Horton and a second for Atkinson, all of which Sullivan converted resulted in an England victory and a 2–0 lead in the series.

Third test

The closest game of the series was played on 20 August in Auckland.  New Zealand again scored first opening up a 5–0 lead with a 
Puti Watene penalty and a try by Hec Brisbane before England struck back with a try by Barney Hudson with Sullivan converting.  Both teams scored further tries, Brisbane's second for New Zealand and Albert Fildes for England to leave the score tied at 8–8 at half-time.

Sullivan kicked two goals early in the second half to put England in front before two tries from Bert Cooke and 
Edwin Abbott, one of which Watene converted put New Zealand 18–12 in front with only minutes to play.  England struck back through Stanley Smith who scored a try and with Sullivan's conversion closed the score to 18–17.  In the last minute of the game Hudson scored his second try of the game to give England victory.

Notes

Footnotes

References

External links
 Pathe News report of the third test against Australia and interview with Great Britain captain Jim Sullivan

Great Britain national rugby league team tours
Great Britain Lions tour of Australia and New Zealand
Great Britain Lions tour of Australia and New Zealand
Great Britain Lions tour of Australia and New Zealand
Rugby league tours of Australia
Rugby league tours of New Zealand
1930s in Auckland
1930s in Sydney
1930s in Brisbane